Tabitha Chawinga (born 22 May 1996) is a Malawian professional footballer who plays as a forward for Italian Serie A club Inter Milan, on loan from Chinese side Wuhan Jianghan University FC, and the Malawi women's national team.

Early life
Born on May 19, 1996, in Rumphi District in northern Malawi, Chawinga is the third of five children born to her parents. She began playing football at age five and played with boys until age 13 when she began playing for girls' club, DD Sunshine in the capital city, Lilongwe. Already at this age she was forced to undress because "Her opponents did not believe she was female because of her physical appearance and how well she played" she told in an interview. Also her sister Temwa Chawinga is a professional player in China.

Playing career

Krokom/Dvärsätts IF, 2014 
At age 18, Chawinga played for Swedish third-division club , where she earned the league's golden boot after scoring 39 goals in 18 games. She was the first women's footballer from Malawi to play for a European club.

Kvarnsvedens IK, 2015–2017
Chawinga joined Kvarnsvedens IK in Sweden's Elitettan in 2015. In her debut for the club, she scored a brace in a 4-0 win over Linköpings FC. The club finished in first place during the regular season with a  record. Chawinga was the league's top scorer with 43 goals – 14 more than the next highest scorer. The club's first place finish secured them promotion to the Damallsvenskan for the 2016 season.

During the 2016 season, Chawinga was the third highest scorer in the league with 15 goals.

In 2017, she finished as the league's top scorer with 26 goals, despite her club's relegation from the Swedish top flight at the end of the season.

Jiangsu Suning, 2018–2021 
After successful spells in Sweden, Chawinga gained the interest from various top clubs abroad and eventually signed for Chinese side Jiangsu Suning, reportedly for a record-breaking transfer fee in Swedish women's football. On 6 May 2018, she scored the winning goal in her full-length debut away to Shanghai.

Wuhan Jiangda 2021–present 
After the main sponsor of Jiangsu Suning stopped supporting Chawinga moved to Wuhan Jiangda where here sister Temwa is playing.

Personal life 
Chawinga's sister Temwa is also a Malawian international footballer.

Honours 
 Kvarnsvedens IK
 Elitettan winner: 2015
Jiangsu Suning

 Chinese Women's Super League: 2019
 Chinese Women's FA Cup: 2019
 Chinese Women's FA Tournament: 2019
 Chinese Women's Super cup : 2019
 AFC Women's Club Championship 2019 : Runners Up

Wuhan Jianghan University
 Chinese Women's Super League: 2021

 Individual
 Elitettan top scorer: 2015
 Damallsvenskan top scorer: 2017
 Damallsvenskan Best attacking player: 2017
 IFFHS CAF Woman Team of the Decade 2011–2020
Chinese Women's Super League Top scorer: 2018, 2019, 2021 
Chinese Women's Super League Player of the Year: 2018, 2019

References

External links 
 Profile at Chinese Football Association data bank 
 Profile at Swedish Football Association
 

1996 births
Living people
Malawian women's footballers
Women's association football forwards
Damallsvenskan players
Kvarnsvedens IK players
Inter Milan (women) players
Malawi women's international footballers
Malawian expatriate footballers
Malawian expatriate sportspeople in Sweden
Expatriate women's footballers in Sweden
Malawian expatriate sportspeople in China
Expatriate women's footballers in China
Expatriate women's footballers in Italy
Malawian expatriate sportspeople in Italy